The 1916–17 Loyola Ramblers men's basketball team represents Loyola University Chicago during the 1916–17 college men's basketball season. The team finished the season with an overall record of 1–3.

Schedule

|-

References

Loyola Ramblers men's basketball seasons
Loyola Ramblers
Loyola Ramblers
Loyola Ramblers